Elisabeth R. Finch is an American television writer best known for her work on the series True Blood and Grey's Anatomy. Finch gained public attention for her abrupt resignation from Grey's Anatomy, which was reportedly prompted by an investigation into a series of lies that she told about her personal and medical history.

Career 
Finch began her career by writing a short film entitled Looking for My Brother, released in 2006. She was then hired as a writers' assistant on True Blood in 2008. She worked on True Blood until 2010 and was credited as a writers' assistant on 17 episodes, as an assistant to writers on five episodes, and as a writer on three episodes.

She wrote two episodes for the first and only series of No Ordinary Family, which aired on ABC from 2010-2011. In 2012 she began working on The Vampire Diaries and was credited as a story writer on six episodes, story editor on two episodes, and executive story editor on 15 episodes. Coworkers reportedly gave her the nickname "Vampire Girl" as a joke referencing the niche she had established working on True Blood and The Vampire Diaries during her early career.

In 2015, Finch began working on Grey's Anatomy as a writer and producer. She wrote 13 episodes and produced a total of 172 episodes before her departure from the series. Finch was also a guest actor in the Grey's Anatomy season 15 episode "Silent All These Years", in which she played the role of Nurse Elisabeth. Finch was offered a position in the writer's room at Grey's Anatomy following the publication of a piece that she had written for Elle Magazine in 2014 about her diagnosis with chondrosarcoma and her experience working as a television writer while undergoing cancer treatments. It has been reported that the chondrosarcoma diagnosis and subsequent story arc of the character Dr. Catherine Avery, played by Debbie Allen, was inspired by Finch's alleged medical history.

Departure from Grey's Anatomy 
Throughout her time working in the writers' room at Grey's Anatomy, Finch wrote a series of essays about her personal medical struggles in publications including Elle, The Hollywood Reporter, and Shondaland. In these articles, she shared stories about her purported diagnosis with chondrosarcoma (a rare bone cancer), having an abortion while undergoing chemotherapy, losing a kidney, and undergoing a knee replacement due to misdiagnosis. Finch wrote several of these fabricated personal stories into plot lines on the show.

In addition to sharing these stories publicly, she reportedly altered her appearance to appear sick while working on Grey's Anatomy and used stories about her medical diagnoses to gain accommodations at work, including deadline extensions and periods of absence. Finch was also reported to share other traumatic stories about her past, including allegations that her brother abused her as a child, that her brother died by suicide, and that she cleaned up the remains of a friend that was killed in the Tree of Life synagogue mass shooting.

In March 2022, it was reported that Disney, a Shondaland affiliate at the time, had opened an investigation into Finch's medical history and alleged falsehoods. The investigation was reportedly prompted when Finch's estranged wife, Jennifer Beyer, contacted Disney and Shondaland with information that she had uncovered about Finch's past. During Disney's investigation, Finch refused to provide medical documentation or undergo an independent medical evaluation to substantiate her claims and she was placed on administrative leave on March 17, 2022. Following her placement on administrative leave, Finch formally resigned and the investigation ended.

In December 2022, Finch admitted that she had lied about her personal and medical history. Finch says that she has not had any form of cancer and that she taped a catheter to her arm and shaved her head to appear as though she was undergoing chemotherapy. Finch also admitted that her brother had not died by suicide and is currently living in Florida.

References

External links 
 

21st-century American screenwriters
American television writers
American women television writers
Living people
Place of birth missing (living people)
Year of birth missing (living people)